Made of Bricks is the debut studio album by English singer-songwriter Kate Nash, released in the United Kingdom on 6 August 2007 by Fiction Records, Cherrytree Records, and the Universal Music Group. The album was a commercial success, topping the UK Albums Chart and spawning a number-two single in the form of the lead single "Foundations". The album was later released in Europe on 10 September and in the United States on 8 January 2008.

Writing and recording
Nash stated in an October 2007 interview for The Village Voice that she wrote all the songs on the album a year and a half before, except for "Skeleton Song", which she had written the same year that the album came out.

Release 
The album was released five weeks earlier than originally planned due to the popularity of "Foundations". The album does not contain the track "Caroline's a Victim", which was released as a limited 7" single, double A-Side with "Birds" on Moshi Moshi Records before "Foundations". "Birds" was included on the album.

A version that included a "making of" DVD was available at Best Buy on the album's release in the United States. In that country, Made of Bricks debuted at number 36 on the Billboard 200 with sales of 16,000. As of January 2010, the album has sold 544,000 copies in United Kingdom and it has sold 168,000 copies in United States according to Nielsen SoundScan.

Reception

Initial critical response to Made of Bricks was positive. At Metacritic, which assigns a normalized rating out of 100 to reviews from mainstream critics, the album has received an average score of 71, based on 23 reviews.

Track listing

Personnel
Musicians
 Kate Nash – vocals, piano, keyboards, acoustic guitar, bass, synthesizers, production 
 Jay Malhotra – electric guitar , bass , acoustic guitar , percussion 
 Elliott Andrews – drums 
 Mei-ling Wong – violin 
 Fiona Brice – strings, brass and woodwind arrangements 
 Leo Taylor – drums 

Production personnel
 Paul Epworth – production
 Mark Rankin – engineering
 Anna Tjan – additional engineering
 Oli Wright – additional engineering
 Steve Fitzmaurice – mixing
 Daniel Morrison – mixing assistance

Additional personnel
 Chrissie Macdonald – art direction
 Richard Robinson – graphic design
 John Short – photography
 Clare Nash – additional photography
 Laura Dockrill – illustrations

Singles
 Nash's debut single, "Foundations", is her most successful single to date. It charted at number #2 in the UK Singles Chart, missing the number one spot to Rihanna's "Umbrella" by less than 200 copies. The song also charted most notably in Canada, Ireland, Germany and Austria.
 The album's second single, "Mouthwash" was performed at T4 on the Beach shortly before its release. The single entered the UK Singles Chart at #54 and two weeks later reached its peak position of #23. It received mixed reviews and did not chart elsewhere.
 The third single release, "Pumpkin Soup", released in October 2007, reached its UK peak position of #23 in January 2008. The song also charted in Austria and Germany. It managed to achieve a number #40 spot in Ireland.
 The fourth and final single released from Made of Bricks was "Merry Happy". The single was predicted to chart well after it was playlisted on BBC Radio 1, however Nash did not release a video for the song. Although it underperformed in the UK, the song did manage to chart in the Top 100 in Canada and was a minor hit in the US.

Chart positions

Weekly charts

Year-end charts

Sales and certifications

References

2007 debut albums
Kate Nash albums